Zhou Lin (1912–1997) was a Chinese politician. He was born in Renhuai, Guizhou Province. He was Chinese Communist Party Committee Secretary and governor of his home province between 1954 and 1964. He was a delegate to the 5th National People's Congress. Persecuted during the Cultural Revolution, Zhou was politically rehabilitated in 1975 and became president of Nanjing University, then party chief Peking University, and a member of the Central Advisory Commission. He died in 1997.

References 

 周林. 法通天下网. [2011-10-06].
 北京大学历任校长书记. Peking University. [2011-10-06].

1912 births
1997 deaths
People's Republic of China politicians from Guizhou
Chinese Communist Party politicians from Guizhou
Governors of Guizhou
Political office-holders in Guizhou
Delegates to the 5th National People's Congress
Members of the Central Advisory Commission
Mayors of Xuzhou